Petar Jovanović (born 9 April 1980) is a Montenegrin basketball coach and former player who is the head coach for Lovćen 1947 of the Montenegrin League.

Coaching career 
On 15 February 2018, Jovanović became a head coach for the Montenegrin team Lovćen 1947 Cetinje. He left the post after the end of the 2017–18 season. On 3 August 2020, he signed back for Lovćen 1947 Cetinje.

References

External links 
 Jovanović ABA League Profile
 Coach Profile at eurobasket.com
 Player Profile at eurobasket.com
 Player Profile at realgm.com

1980 births
Living people
KK Lovćen coaches
KK Lovćen players
KK Leotar players
OKK Vrbas players
Montenegrin basketball coaches
Montenegrin expatriate basketball people in Kosovo
Montenegrin expatriate basketball people in Serbia
Montenegrin men's basketball players
Point guards
Sportspeople from Cetinje